Georg Albrecht Klebs (23 October 1857 – 15 October 1918) was a German botanist from Neidenburg (Nidzica), Prussia. His brother was the historian Elimar Klebs.

Life

Klebs studied chemistry, philosophy, and art history at the University of Königsberg and became an assistant to Anton de Bary at the University of Strassburg. After his military service, Klebs became an assistant to Julius Sachs at the University of Würzburg and Wilhelm Pfeffer at the University of Tübingen. He became a professor at the University of Basel in 1887, the University of Halle in 1898, and the University of Heidelberg in 1907, where he founded today's botanical garden, the Botanischer Garten der Universität Heidelberg.

Klebs received a Croonian Lectureship in 1910. From 1910 to 1912 he travelled through Siberia, Japan, Java, India, the Caucasus, and southern Russia. In 1913 he participated in an expedition to Egypt. He died in Heidelberg from influenza during the 1918 influenza pandemic.

Publications
 Zur Entwicklungsphysiologie der Farnprothaillen, 3 Bände, 1917
 Beiträge zur Physiologie der Pflanzenzelle, 1888
 Die Bedingungen der Fortpflanzung bei einigen Algen und Pilzen, 1896, 2. Auflage 1928
 Willkürliche Entwicklungsänderungen bei Pflanzen – Ein Beitrag zur Physiologie der Entwicklung, 1903

References and external links

Biography 

1857 births
1918 deaths
Deaths from Spanish flu
19th-century German botanists
People from the Province of Prussia
University of Königsberg alumni
Academic staff of the University of Basel
Academic staff of the Martin Luther University of Halle-Wittenberg
Academic staff of Heidelberg University
Infectious disease deaths in Germany
20th-century German botanists